Jorge Espinoza is a retired professional soccer player from Chile who played in the Major Indoor Soccer League and National Professional Soccer League.  He also coached at the high school, collegiate and professional levels including two games with the San Jose Clash of Major League Soccer in 1999.

Player
From 1972 to 1979, Espinoza played for Colo Colo in Chile.  In 1979, he moved to the United States and signed with the Chicago Sting of the North American Soccer League.  Over three seasons with the Sting, Espinoza was hampered by knee injuries and did not crack the first team.  In 1981, he moved to the Memphis Americans in the Major Indoor Soccer League.  He spent three seasons in Memphis before moving with the team to Las Vegas in 1984.  He then played the 1984-1985 MISL season with the Las Vegas Americans.  The team folded at the end of the season and the Pittsburgh Spirit moved to sign Espinoza.  However, the Wichita Wings also claimed him.  MISL commissioner Francis Dale awarded the rights to Espinoza to the Wings on September 26, 1985.  In September 1986, the Wings sold Espinoza's contract to the Kansas City Comets.  On June 4, 1987, the Comets released Espinoza.  He then signed as a free agent with the Dallas Sidekicks on November 17, 1987.  The Sidekicks released him at the end of the season. In the summer of 1987 he played in the National Soccer League with Toronto Italia. He then moved to Canada to sign with the North York Rockets of the Canadian Soccer League.  He played two seasons with the Rockets, then returned to the United States in 1990 to join the Illinois Thunder of the National Professional Soccer League.  He played one season with the Thunder, scoring eight goals.  In January 1992, Espinoza signed with the Milwaukee Wave of the NPSL.  The Wave released him at the end of the season.

Coach
When the Kansas City Comets released Espinoza in the summer of 1987, he turned to coaching the Palatine High School boys soccer team while waiting for another team to sign him.  On September 1, 1990, Rosary College hired Espinoza as head coach of the soccer team.  In 1993, he moved to Triton College.  In 1994, he coached the Rockford Raptors of the USISL.  In 1995, he coached the Mexico Toros of the Continental Indoor Soccer League.  He coached the team to a 17-11 record.  In February 1996, the Indiana Twisters of the Continental Indoor Soccer League hired Espinoza as its head coach.  Over two seasons, he took them to a 27-29 record.  In 1998, the San Jose Clash hired Espinoza as an assistant coach.  In 1999, the Clash fired Brian Quinn. Espinosa served as head coach for two games, both victories, before Lothar Osiander assumed the position of head coach.  In 2004 and 2005, Espinoza served as the head coach of the Del Mar High School girls soccer team.  In May 2006, Espinoza became the head coach of the Gavilan College women's soccer team.  In December 2007, he was named the head coach of the San Jose Frogs.

References

External links
NASL/MISL stats
Jorge Espinoza Soccer Academy
Dallas Sidekicks profile

1953 births
Living people
Footballers from Santiago
Chilean footballers
Chilean expatriate footballers
Colo-Colo footballers
Chicago Sting (NASL) players
Memphis Americans players
Las Vegas Americans players
Wichita Wings (MISL) players
Kansas City Comets (original MISL) players
Toronto Italia players
Dallas Sidekicks (original MISL) players
North York Rockets players
Illinois Thunder players
Milwaukee Wave players
Major Indoor Soccer League (1978–1992) players
National Professional Soccer League (1984–2001) players
Canadian Soccer League (1987–1992) players
Canadian National Soccer League players
Association football midfielders
Chilean football managers
Chilean expatriate football managers
San Jose Earthquakes coaches
USISL coaches
Continental Indoor Soccer League coaches
Major League Soccer coaches
Chilean expatriate sportspeople in the United States
Chilean expatriate sportspeople in Canada
Chilean expatriate sportspeople in Mexico
Expatriate soccer players in the United States
Expatriate soccer players in Canada
Expatriate soccer managers in the United States
Expatriate football managers in Mexico